The Pearl River Delta Economic Zone (once called 粤江平原), is a special economic zone on the southeastern coast of China. Located in the Pearl River Delta, it consists of the Chinese cities of Guangzhou, Shenzhen, Zhuhai, Foshan, Dongguan, Zhongshan, Jiangmen, and parts of Huizhou and Zhaoqing. Adjacent Hong Kong and Macau are not part of the economic zone.

The 2008-20 plan, released by China's National Development and Reform Commission, is designed to boost the pan-Pearl River Delta as a "center of advanced manufacturing and modern service industries", and as a "center for international shipping, logistics, trade, conferences and exhibitions and tourism". Goals include the development of two to three new cities in the Guangdong-Hong Kong-Macao Greater Bay Area, the development of 10 new multinational firms, and expansion of road, rail, seaport and airport capacities by 2020. They include construction of the  Hong Kong–Zhuhai–Macau Bridge linking Hong Kong, Macau and the Pearl River Delta.

Scale
The zone is formed by 9 cities, namely Guangzhou, Shenzhen, Foshan, Zhuhai, Jiangmen, Zhongshan, Dongguan, four districts and counties of Huizhou and four districts and counties of Zhaoqing.

Population
A 2015 report concluded that, if taken as a single urban area, the zone is the largest such area in the world in both area and population.

See also
Yangtze River Delta Economic Zone
Bohai Economic Rim
West Triangle Economic Zone
Guangdong-Hong Kong-Macao Greater Bay Area

References

Economic profile for the Pearl River Delta at HKTDC

Economy of Guangdong
Pearl River Delta
Special Economic Zones of China